Fabien Lefèvre (born 18 June 1982) is a French slalom canoeist who has competed at the international level since 1998]. As a permanent resident of the United States, he has competed for his country of residence since 2013. He represented France until 2011. He won two medals at the Summer Olympics in the K1 event with a silver in 2008 and a bronze in 2004. He has a son called Noe Lefèvre.

Lefèvre also won fourteen medals at the ICF Canoe Slalom World Championships with seven golds (C1: 2014, K1: 2002, 2003; C2 team: 2010, 2011; K1 team: 2005, 2006), five silvers (C2: 2010, 2011; K1: 2005, K1 team: 2010, 2011), and two bronzes (K1 team: 2002, K1: 2011).

He is the overall World Cup champion in the K1 class from 2002. He also won two bronze medals at the European Championships in the K1 team event.

Career
Fabien Lefevre began kayaking at the age of 5. At the age of 20, he won the K1 event at the 2002 ICF Canoe Slalom World Championships in Bourg-Saint-Maurice. He backed up this result by winning the 2002 World Cup title. One year later he was able to defend the K1 world title in Augsburg.

These victories made him the favorite for the 2004 Summer Olympics in Athens. However, he was only able to capture bronze after touching a gate in both semifinal and final run. He recorded the fastest running time but the 4 penalty seconds pushed him down to third.

At the 2005 World Championships in Penrith, New South Wales he won a silver medal in the K1 event, losing only to Fabian Dörfler. He won the K1 team title, however, together with Benoît Peschier and Julien Billaut. He won the K1 team gold again in 2006, this time joined by Julien Billaut and Boris Neveu. He finished 5th in the individual event in 2006 in a race where two winners were declared by the ICF jury (Julien Billaut and Stefano Cipressi).

In 2007 a serious wrist injury prevented him from taking part at the World Championships in Foz do Iguaçu, won by his compatriot Sébastien Combot.

He regained his place in the French team in 2008 and won the selection for the 2008 Summer Olympics in Beijing by defeating the reigning Olympic champion Benoît Peschier at the French trials. Lefèvre was third after the semifinal run and improved to silver medal position in the final. Benjamin Boukpeti, a friend of Lefèvre, won the first Olympic medal for Togo with a bronze, while Alexander Grimm took gold.

In late 2008, inspired by Michael Phelps, he decided to take up the double canoe discipline (C2) together with Denis Gargaud Chanut, while continuing to race in single kayak (K1) with the ambition to appear in both categories at the 2012 Summer Olympics. Lefèvre failed to medal at the 2009 World Championships in La Seu d'Urgell in either category though. The extreme fatigue he felt after the races made him doubt his project.

However, he continued in both categories in 2010 and ended the year with a silver medal in the C2 event at the World Championships in Tacen. He also added a gold medal in the C2 team event and a silver in the K1 team event. A year later at the 2011 World Championships in Bratislava he made history by becoming the first slalom canoeist since Charles Dussuet in 1953 to win 4 medals at the same Championships.

The success, however, was followed by a disappointment in 2012 after failing to qualify for the Olympics in London in either category.

Nonetheless, after 2012, Fabien moved to the United States and began competing as an American Canoe Slalom Athlete. Fabien began training with the Potomac Whitewater Racing Center (a U.S. Olympic Center of Excellence). Subsequently, at the 2014 World Championship in Deep Creek Lake, he won the gold medal in C1, becoming the first male slalom canoeist to win the World Championship title in C1 and K1.

World Cup individual podiums

1 World Championship counting for World Cup points

References

 2010 ICF Canoe Slalom World Championships 11 September 2010 C2 men's final results – accessed 11 September 2010.
 2010 ICF Canoe Slalom World Championships 11 September 2010 C2 men's team final results. – accessed 11 September 2010.
 2010 ICF Canoe Slalom World Championships 12 September 2010 K1 men's team final results – accessed 12 September 2010.
 
 Paddling for the USA – accessed 25 April 2014.

External links

1982 births
Living people
Canoeists at the 2004 Summer Olympics
Canoeists at the 2008 Summer Olympics
French male canoeists
Olympic canoeists of France
Olympic silver medalists for France
Olympic bronze medalists for France
Olympic medalists in canoeing
Medalists at the 2008 Summer Olympics
Officers of the Ordre national du Mérite
Medalists at the 2004 Summer Olympics
Sportspeople from Orléans